John Mrakov (born 17 November 1968) is a former Australian rules footballer who played with Collingwood and Richmond in the Victorian/Australian Football League (VFL/AFL).

Mrakov was recruited from the Wanderers Football Club in Victoria.

He played three games for Collingwood, one in 1987 and the other two in 1989.

Richmond secured Mrakov in the 1991 Pre-Season Draft and he made eight appearances in the 1991 AFL season.

References

External links

 

 

Australian rules footballers from Victoria (Australia)
Collingwood Football Club players
Richmond Football Club players
Living people

1968 births